Edgemont Church is a historic Christian Church (Disciples of Christ) church building located near Christiansburg, Montgomery County, Virginia.  It was built about 1860, and is a one-story, three bay by three bay, frame structure. It has a pedimented principal facade with a large circular louvered vent, paneled corner pilasters with molded capitals and segmentally arched openings.  Also on the property is a contributing church cemetery.

It was listed on the National Register of Historic Places in 1989.

References

Churches on the National Register of Historic Places in Virginia
Churches completed in 1860
Churches in Montgomery County, Virginia
National Register of Historic Places in Montgomery County, Virginia